The 2018 Chevrolet Silverado 250 was a NASCAR Camping World Truck Series race held on August 26, 2018 at Canadian Tire Motorsport Park in Bowmanville, Ontario. Contested over 65 laps on the  road course due to an overtime finish, it was the 17th race of the 2018 NASCAR Camping World Truck Series season.

Entry list

Qualifying

Qualifying results

Race

Stage Results

Stage 1

Stage 2

Final Stage Results

Stage 3

References

Chevrolet Silverado 250
NASCAR races at Canadian Tire Motorsport Park
2018 NASCAR Camping World Truck Series